Bal Mini (also Romanized as Bal Mīnī and Bāl Mīnī; also known as Bāl Mīnī-ye Bālā) is a village in Doshman Ziari Rural District, Doshman Ziari District, Mamasani County, Fars Province, Iran. At the 2006 census, its population was 368, in 109 families.

References 

Populated places in Mamasani County